Philippe Anziani (born 21 September 1961) is a French former football striker and manager. In 2019, he became manager of the Olympique de Marseille reserves in the fourth tier.

Coaching career
Anziani became SC Bastia manager ahead of the 2009–10 season. On 26 November 2009, he was fired due to poor results.

He was named FC Nantes manager in March 2011.

References

External links
 Profile at FFF
 

1961 births
Living people
People from Annaba
French footballers
France international footballers
Association football forwards
Ligue 1 players
FC Sochaux-Montbéliard players
AS Monaco FC players
FC Nantes players
Racing Club de France Football players
SC Toulon players
FC Martigues players
Gazélec Ajaccio players
French football managers
Ligue 1 managers
FC Sochaux-Montbéliard managers
SC Bastia managers
FC Nantes managers
Pieds-Noirs